Maxwell Francis Madden (born 29 October 1941) is a British journalist and Labour Party politician.

Parliamentary career
Madden unsuccessfully fought Sudbury and Woodbridge in 1966, coming second.

He was elected as Member of Parliament (MP) for Sowerby at the February 1974 election, which he lost to the Conservatives in 1979.

From 1983 until 1997, he was MP for Bradford West before being deselected and replaced as Labour candidate by Marsha Singh.

References

External links 
 

1941 births
Living people
British male journalists
Labour Party (UK) MPs for English constituencies
Transport and General Workers' Union-sponsored MPs
UK MPs 1974
UK MPs 1974–1979
UK MPs 1983–1987
UK MPs 1987–1992
UK MPs 1992–1997
Members of Parliament for Bradford West